Andrew Matthews, M.A. (18 June 181514 September 1897) was a British clergyman and an entomologist who specialised in beetles (Coleoptera).

In an obituary in The Zoologist the reverend Matthews is called a "well-known British naturalist." He was more widely known as an entomologist than an ornithologist. He was also a successful floriculturist.

Little is known of him. According to the frontispiece of his 1878 book Trichopterygia illustrata he was styled "The Reverend" and held an M.A. degree from Oxford University. 

When he died, aged eighty-two, he had been a rector at Gumley, Leicestershire for forty-four years.

He studied some of the tiniest beetles, which are the most difficult to identify. He described several species, notably in the genus Nicrophorus, and is the binomial authority for at least three. His collection passed to Philip Brookes Mason, of Burton-on-Trent, who edited some of Matthews' papers for posthumous publication.

His chief entomological interests were in the families Trichopterygia, Corylophidae and Sphaeriidae.

Species described 
 Nicrophorus mexicanus (1888)
 Nicrophorus montezumae (1888), junior synonym of N. marginatus
 Nicrophorus olidus (1888)
 Nicrophorus quadrimaculatus (1888)

Publications

References

Sources 
  

1815 births
Place of birth unknown
1897 deaths
Place of death unknown
British entomologists
Alumni of the University of Oxford